Svetla Kashtelyan (born 13 August 1958) is a Bulgarian gymnast. She competed in six events at the 1976 Summer Olympics.

References

1958 births
Living people
Bulgarian female artistic gymnasts
Olympic gymnasts of Bulgaria
Gymnasts at the 1976 Summer Olympics
Place of birth missing (living people)